The 1938 Penn Quakers football team was an American football team that represented the University of Pennsylvania as an independent during the 1938 college football season. In its first season under head coach George Munger, the team compiled a 3–2–3 record and was outscored by a total of 89 to 58. The team played its home games at Franklin Field in Philadelphia.

Schedule

References

Penn
Penn Quakers football seasons
Penn Quakers football